This is a list of diplomatic missions in Colombia. There are currently 62 embassies in Bogotá. Some other countries have non resident embassies.

Embassies in Bogotá

Other posts in Bogotá
 (Delegation)
 (Mission)
 (Commercial Office)

Consulates General / Consulates

Arauca

Barranquilla

Bucaramanga

Cartagena

Cúcuta

Ipiales

Leticia
 (Vice-consulate)

Medellín

Puerto Carreño

Riohacha

Non-resident Embassies

Closed missions

See also
List of diplomatic missions of Colombia
Visa requirements for Colombian citizens

References
   List of embassies

List
Colombia
Diplomatic missions